A trading company is a business that works with different kinds of products sold for consumer, business purposes. In contemporary times, trading companies buy a specialized range of products, shopkeeper them, and coordinate delivery of products to customers. 

Trading companies may connect buyers and sellers, but not partake in the ownership or storage of goods, earning their revenue through sales commissions. They may also be structured to engage in commerce with foreign countries or territories. During times of colonization, some trading companies were granted a charter, giving them "rights to a specific territory within an area claimed by the authority granting the charter including legal title, a monopoly of trade, and governmental and military jurisdiction".

Trading companies

  Afghan-German Trading Company
  African & Eastern Trade Corporation
  Augustine Heard & Co.
  Austrian East India Company
  Barbary Company
  Bergen Greenland Company
  Black Sea Trade Company (Trade Company Poland)
  Bombay Burmah Trading Corporation
  Compagnie de Chine
  Compagnie de Saint-Christophe
  Compagnie des Îles de l'Amérique
  Compagnie du Nord
  Company of the Moluccas
  Company of Habitants
  Company of One Hundred Associates
  Company of Scotland
  Comprador
  Courteen association
  Danish East India Company
  Danish West India Company
  David Sassoon & Co.
  Dent & Co.
  Dieppe Company
  Dodwell & Co.
  Dutch East India Company
  Dutch West India Company
  E.D. Sassoon & Co.
  British East India Company
  French East India Company
  French West India Company
  General Trade Company
  Gibb, Livingston & Co.
  Grand Anadolu İnternational Commodity Trading House
  Guinea Company (London)
  Guinea Company of Scotland
  Guipuzcoan Company of Caracas
  Hudson's Bay Company
  Hutchison Whampoa
  Indonesia Trading Company
  Jardine Matheson
  Kaptallah
  King George's Sound Company
  Kunst and Albers
  Lamson & Hubbard Trading Company
  Levant Company
  Li & Fung
  London and Bristol Company
  London Company
  Middelburgsche Commercie Compagnie
  Mississippi Company
  MMTC Ltd
 Muscovy Company, English trading company chartered in 1555 as the first major chartered joint stock company
  North West Company
  Northern Traders Company
  Northwest Cameroon Company
  Olyphant & Co.
 Portuguese East India Company
  Royal African Company
  Royal Greenland Trading Department
  Royal Philippine Company
  Samuel Samuel & Co
  Serapis Global Company
  Shewan, Tomes & Co.
  Society of Berbice
  Society of Suriname
  Somers Isles Company
  South Cameroon Company
 Swedish East India Company
 Swedish South Company
  Swedish West India Company
  Virginia Company

By country

Philippines

  Amaggi Group

Japan

  Hartz Mountain Corporation 
  Inabata & Co., Ltd. 
  Itochu 
  JEM Industries Corp
  Marubeni 
  Mitsubishi Corporation 
  Mitsui & Co. 
  Sogo shosha 
  Sojitz Corporation 
  Sumitomo Corporation 
  Toyota Tsusho

Türkiye

  Grand Anadolu İnternational Commodity Trading House

South Korea

  POSCO International
  Hyundai Corporation
  LG Corporation
  Samsung C&T Corporation
  SK Networks

Oil traders

  Chemoil
  DME Oman Crude Oil Futures Contract
  Glencore
  Gunvor
  Mercuria Energy Group
  MOL Group
  Salam Investment
  Trafigura
  Vitol
  Vopak

See also

 Canton System
 Chartered company
 Fur trade
 Lists of companies (category)
 Old China Trade
 Spice wars
 Trade

References

Further reading
 Carlos, Ann M., and Stephen Nicholas. "'Giants of an Earlier Capitalism': The Chartered Trading Companies as Modern Multinationals." Business history review 62.3 (1988): 398-419. in JSTOR
 Ferguson, Niall. The ascent of money: A financial history of the world (2008).
 Jones, Geoffrey. Multinationals and Global Capitalism: From the Nineteenth to the Twenty-first Century (2004)
 Lipson, E. The Economic History of England (1931) pp 184-370 gives capsule histories of 10 major English trading companies: The Merchant Adventurers, the East India Company, the Eastland Company, the Russia Company,  the Levant Company, the African Company, the Hudson's Bay Company, the French Company, the Spanish Company, and the South Sea Company.

External links
 

Distribution (marketing)
Trading